FBS may refer to:

People 
 Frederik Batti Sorring, known as FBS, Indonesian politician

Schools 
 Faith Baptist School (disambiguation)
 France Business School, in France
 Friern Barnet School, in London
 Friends Boys' School, one of two Ramallah Friends Schools in the West Bank

Science and medicine 
 Failed back syndrome
 Fasting blood sugar
 Fetal bovine serum
 Frontiers in Bioscience, an academic journal
 Function-Behaviour-Structure ontology
 Lees-Haley Fake Bad Scale

Other uses
 Federal Bureau of Statistics of the Government of Pakistan  
 Fellow of the Burgon Society, in the United Kingdom
 Friday Harbor Seaplane Base, in Washington, United States
 Fukuoka Broadcasting System, a Japanese TV station
 Furness Building Society, a British financial institution
 NCAA Division I Football Bowl Subdivision, part of college football in the United States

See also 
 FB (disambiguation)